HD 91942 is a single variable star in the constellation Carina. It has the Bayer designation r Carinae, while HD 91942 is the identifier from the Henry Draper catalogue. This orange-hued object is visible to the naked eye with an apparent visual magnitude of 4.45. Based on parallax measurements, it is located at a distance of approximately 1,180 light years from the Sun. The star has an absolute magnitude of −3.77, and is drifting further away with a radial velocity of +9.9 km/s.

This object is a massive, aging bright giant with a stellar classification of K3II-IIb. It is a suspected variable star that fluctuates in magnitude by an amplitude of 0.05 in the B-band of the UBV photometric system. With the supply of hydrogen exhausted at its core, it has evolved of the main sequence and cooled and expanded to 156 times the Sun's radius. It is an estimated 36 million years old with eight times the mass of the Sun. It is radiating around 5,500 times the luminosity of the Sun from its swollen photosphere at an effective temperature of 3,983 K.

References 

K-type bright giants
Carinae, r
Carina (constellation)
Durchmusterung objects
091942
051849
4159